The king rat (Uromys rex) is a large species of rodent in the family Muridae. It is endemic to the island of Guadalcanal in the Solomon Islands. Like the two other species of rodent in Guadalcanal, it is placed in the genus Uromys. It lives in trees and is larger than Uromys porculus but smaller than Uromys imperator.

References

Uromys
Mammals of the Solomon Islands
Endemic fauna of the Solomon Islands
Mammals described in 1888
Taxa named by Oldfield Thomas